In solid mechanics, a stress concentration (also called a stress raiser or a stress riser) is a location in an object where the stress is significantly greater than the surrounding region. Stress concentrations occur when there are irregularities in the geometry or material of a structural component that cause an interruption to the flow of stress. This arises from such details as holes, grooves, notches and fillets. Stress concentrations may also occur from accidental damage such as nicks and scratches.

The degree of concentration of a discontinuity under typically tensile loads can be expressed as a non-dimensional stress concentration factor , which is the ratio of the highest stress to the nominal far field stress. For a circular hole in an infinite plate, . The stress concentration factor should not be confused with the stress intensity factor, which is used to define the effect of a crack on the stresses in the region around a crack tip.

For ductile materials, large loads can cause localised plastic deformation or yielding that will typically occur first at a stress concentration allowing a redistribution of stress and enabling the component to continue to carry load. Brittle materials will typically fail at the stress concentration. However, repeated low level loading may cause a fatigue crack to initiate and slowly grow at a stress concentration leading to the failure of even ductile materials. Fatigue cracks always start at stress raisers, so removing such defects increases the fatigue strength.

Description  
Stress concentrations occur when there are irregularities in the geometry or material of a structural component that cause an interruption to the flow of stress.

Geometric discontinuities cause an object to experience a localised increase in stress.  Examples of shapes that cause stress concentrations are sharp internal corners, holes, and sudden changes in the cross-sectional area of the object as well as unintentional damage such as nicks, scratches and cracks. High local stresses can cause objects to fail more quickly, so engineers typically design the geometry to minimize stress concentrations. 

Material discontinuities, such as inclusions in metals, may also concentrate the stress. Inclusions on the surface of a component may be broken from machining during manufacture leading to microcracks that grow in service from cyclic loading. Internally, the failure of the interfaces around inclusions during loading may lead to static failure by microvoid coalescence.

Stress concentration factor 
The stress concentration factor, is the ratio of the highest stress  to a nominal stress  of the gross cross-section and defined as
 

Note that the dimensionless stress concentration factor is a function of the geometry shape and independent of its size. These factors can be found in typical engineering reference materials. 

E. Kirsch derived the equations for the elastic stress distribution around a hole. The maximum stress felt near a hole or notch occurs in the area of lowest radius of curvature.  In an elliptical hole of length  and width , under a far-field stress , the stress at the ends of the major axes is given by Inglis' equation:

where  is the radius of curvature of the elliptical hole.

As the radius of curvature approaches zero, such as at the tip of a sharp crack, the maximum stress approaches infinity and a stress concentration factor cannot therefore be used for a crack. Instead, the stress intensity factor which defines the scaling of the stress field around a crack tip, is used.

Methods for determining factors 
There are experimental methods for measuring stress concentration factors including photoelastic stress analysis, thermoelastic stress analysis, brittle coatings or strain gauges. 

During the design phase, there are multiple approaches to estimating stress concentration factors. Several catalogs of stress concentration factors have been published. Perhaps most famous is Stress Concentration Design Factors by Peterson, first published in 1953. Finite element methods are commonly used in design today.

Limiting the effects of stress concentrations 
Known as crack tip blunting, a counter-intuitive method of reducing one of the worst types of stress concentrations, a crack, is to drill a large hole at the end of the crack.  The drilled hole, with its relatively large size, serves to increase the effective crack tip radius and thus reduce the stress concentration.  

Another method used to decrease the stress concentration is by adding a fillet to internal corners. This reduces the stress concentration and results in smoother flow of stress streamlines. 

In a threaded component, the force flow line is bent as it passes from shank portion to threaded portion; as a result, stress concentration takes place. To reduce this, a small undercut is made between the shank and threaded portions.

Examples 

 The de Havilland Comet aircraft experienced a number of catastrophic failures that were eventually found to be due to fatigue cracks growing from the high stress concentration caused by the use of punched rivet holes around the windows. The square passenger windows were also found to have higher stress concentrations than expected and were redesigned. 
 Brittle fractures at the corners of hatches in Liberty ships in cold and stressful conditions in winter storms in the Atlantic Ocean.

 A focus point of stress on the margins of an implant, where metal meets bone, of an implanted orthosis is very likely to be the point of failure.

References

External links
When Metal Lets Us Down

Engineering concepts
Elasticity (physics)